Menemerus natalis is a jumping spider species in the genus Menemerus that lives in South Africa. The male was first described by Wanda Wesołowska in 1999.

References

Endemic fauna of South Africa
Spiders described in 1999
Salticidae
Spiders of South Africa
Taxa named by Wanda Wesołowska